Raymond Cordy (9 December 1898 – 23 April 1956) was a French film actor, born Raymond Cordiaux.  He appeared in over a hundred and thirty films during his career.

Selected filmography

 Little Lise (1930) - Un joueur de billard
 Everybody Wins (1930) - Le pochard
 Maison de danses (1931)
 Le Million (1931) - Le chauffeur de taxi
 Departure (1931)
 Montmartre (1931) - Le boulanger du village (uncredited)
 Atout coeur (1931) - Finois
 A nous la liberté (1931) - Louis
 Dance Hall (1931) - Le machiniste
 Amourous Adventure (1932)
 Pour un sou d'amour (1932) - Antoine - le chauffeur
 Wooden Crosses (1932) - Soldat Vairon
 L'affaire de la rue Mouffetard (1932) - L'accusé
  (1932)
 Pomme d'amour (1932) - Bayard
 Le petit Babouin (1932) - Petitrone
 Le bidon d'or (1932) - Boulot
 L'homme qui ne sait pas dire non (1932)
 Bastille Day (1933) - Jean's Fellow Cabbie
 Attendez, chauffeur! (1933)
 The Testament of Dr. Mabuse (1933) - Koretsky
 Je vous aimerai toujours (1933) - Le laboureur
 The Oil Sharks (1933) - Hans Mertens
 Une femme au volant (1933) - Le mécanicien
 Colomba (1933) - Giocanto Vastriconi
 Les bleus du ciel (1933) - Achille
 Quelqu'un a tué... (1933)
 Au bout du monde (1934) - Dédé
 Vive la compagnie (1934) - Victor Lahuche
 La garnison amoureuse (1934) - Pierre, un cavalier
 Toboggan (1934) - Patte de Quinquina
 The House on the Dune (1934) 
 L'aristo (1934) - Bérnu
 The Last Billionaire (1934) - Valet
 Mam'zelle Spahi (1934) - Perlot - l'ordonnance du lieutenant
 L'hôtel du libre échange (1934) - Bastien
 Le cavalier Lafleur (1934) - Verjus
 L'auberge du Petit-Dragon (1934) - Émile
 Gold in the Street (1934) - Pierre - un ami d'Albert
 Slipper Episode (1935) - Le pêcheur
 Le billet de mille (1935) - Un inspecteur
 Pension Mimosas (1935) - Morel
 La caserne en folie (1935) - Victor
 Jacqueline fait du cinéma (1935)
 Juanita (1935) - Pied-Mignon
 La rosière des Halles (1935) - Raymond
 Madame Angot's Daughter (1935) - Louchard
 The Mysteries of Paris (1935) - Cabrion
 Flight Into Darkness (1935) - Mathieu - l'ordonnance
 Adémaï au moyen âge (1935) - Le chef de garde
 Sous la griffe (1935) - Corn
 Return to Paradise (1935)
 Son excellence Antonin (1935) - Antonin
 Lune de miel (1935) - Le portier
 L'impossible aveu (1935) - Le patron du bal
 Les gaîtés de la finance (1936) - Le pisteur
 Haut comme trois pommes (1936) - Victor
 Marinella (1936) - (uncredited)
 Excursion Train (1936) - Pigeonnet
 Le roman d'un spahi (1936) - Boyer
 The Flame (1936) - Le gaffeur
 Le prince des Six Jours (1936)
 La brigade en jupons (1936) - Casimir
 They Were Five (1936) - L'ivrogne
 Girls of Paris (1936) - Emile le Taxi
 Notre-Dame d'amour (1936) - Antonin Cabrol
 J'arrose mes galons (1936)
 La tentation (1936)
 À minuit, le 7 (1937) - Robert Tirard
 Les réprouvés (1937) - Badar
 Gigolette (1937) - Le coiffeur
 Trois artilleurs au pensionnat (1937) - M. Plume, le charcutier
 Le choc en retour (1937) - Totor
 Ignace (1937) - Le soldat Philibert
 L'île des veuves (1937) - Le chauffeur
 La treizième enquête de Grey (1937) - Corvetto
 The West (1938) - Carbonniès
 Les gaietés de l'exposition (1938) - Goléar
 Le coeur ébloui (1938)
 L'ange que j'ai vendu (1938) - Paul
 Runaway Ladies (1938) - Minor Role
 Alexis gentleman chauffeur (1938) - Émile¨Panard
 S.O.S. Sahara (1938) - Charles
 Lights of Paris (1938) - Toto
 La marraine du régiment (1938) - Perlot
 Return at Dawn (1938) - Pali
 Mon curé chez les riches (1938) - Plumoiseau
 Place de la Concorde (1939) - Charles, le chauffeur
 Feux de joie (1939) - Jules
 The Fatted Calf (1939) - Le curé
 Sur le plancher des vaches (1940) - Maurice Veller
 Sing Anyway (1940) - Pimpant
 The Strangers in the House (1942) - L'huissier aux Assises
 La grande marnière (1943) - Courtois
 Le val d'enfer (1943) - Poiroux
 Feu Nicolas (1943) - Victor
 The White Waltz (1943) - Le peintre René Dupré
 Vingt-quatre heures de perm (1945) - Martin
 Ils étaient cinq permissionnaires (1945) - Pimpant
 Le roi des resquilleurs (1945) - Béru
 Special Mission (1946) - Mérignac - un policier de l'équipe de Chabrier
 The Village of Wrath (1947) - Richelieu
 Les beaux jours du roi Murat (1947) - Le père La Grogne
 Man About Town (1947) - Le Frisé
 Criminal Brigade (1947) - Mérignac
 Passeurs d'or (1948) - Roussel
 56 Rue Pigalle (1949) - Le chauffeur de taxi
 My Aunt from Honfleur (1949) - Clément
 Les vagabonds du rêve (1949)
 Beauty and the Devil (1950) - Antoine the Servant
 Blonde (1950) - Le brigadier
 Le gang des tractions-arrière (1950) - Marcel La Sauvette
 Piédalu à Paris (1951) - L'huissier-chef
 Capitaine Ardant (1951) - Jules
 Monsieur Octave (1951)
 Trois vieilles filles en folie (1952) - Bébert
 Alone in the World (1952) - Jules
 Beauties of the Night (1952) - Gaston / Le marquis
 Piédalu fait des miracles (1952)
 Milady and the Musketeers (1952) - Nobile
 Ils sont dans les vignes... (1952) - Arbaner
 Son of the Hunchback (1952) - Passepoil
 Manina, the Girl in the Bikini (1952) - Francis - le barman
 Tourbillon (1953) - Le régisseur
 Children of Love (1953) - Le policier
 Piédalu député (1954) - Gardonnet
 Tourments (1954) - Jo Bractonne
 Sidi-Bel-Abbès (1954) - Caporal Génicot
 Trois jours de bringue à Paris (1954) - Le garçon de restaurant
 La patrouille des sables (1954) - Peaulegain
 Le congrès des belles-mères (1954) - Le garde champêtre
 Your Turn, Callaghan (1955) - Le portier
 La pícara molinera (1955) - Alcalde
 The Grand Maneuver (1955) - Le photographe
 La fierecilla domada (1956) - Bautista de Martos
 Les indiscrètes (1956) - Martin
 Bonjour jeunesse (1957) - (final film role)

References

Bibliography
 Youngkin, Stephen. The Lost One: A Life of Peter Lorre. University Press of Kentucky, 2005.

External links

1898 births
1956 deaths
French male film actors
20th-century French male actors